Vindegga Spur is a prominent ridge just south of Vindegghallet Glacier in the Humboldt Mountains of Queen Maud Land. Discovered and photographed by the German Antarctic Expedition, 1938–39. Mapped by Norway from air photos and surveys by Norwegian Antarctic Expedition, 1956–60, and named Vindegga (the wind ridge).

Ridges of Queen Maud Land
Humboldt Mountains (Antarctica)